Khusimol is a sesquiterpene found in oil of vetiver. It contains a tricyclic hydrocarbon core, with a hydroxy methyl group, two methyl groups and a methylene group. It constitutes the biggest part of oil of vetiver, around 15%. The substance was initially discovered by D. C. Umarani in 1966 and separatated by using distillation and column chromatography.

References

Sesquiterpenes